Solitary Watch is a web-based project made to bring the widespread use of solitary confinement into the eyes of the public. Its mission is to provide the public—as well as practicing attorneys, legal scholars, law enforcement, people in prison and their families and others with a centralized source of unfolding news, original reporting, firsthand accounts, and background research on solitary confinement in the United States.

History 

In December 2009, Solitary Watch launched its website. Overseen by journalist James Ridgeway and writer/editor Jean Casella, the website's features include original reporting, an archive of resources and information and the "Voices from Solitary" Project which collects firsthand stories from people who have served time in solitary confinement. Within its first nine months, the website attracted over 100,000 visitors. David Bruck is involved with the project.

Voices from Solitary 

As of 2015, Solitary Watch has collected over 100 memoirs, essays, stories, poems and blogs written by current and former prisoners held in solitary confinement.

Publications 

Hell Is a Very Small Place: Voices from Solitary Confinement. Edited by Jean Casella, James Ridgeway and Sarah Shourd. It was published by The New Press on February 2, 2016.

References

External links 
 Solitary Watch
 Alternet Interview with James Ridgeway and Jean Casella

Human rights organizations based in the United States
Prison reform
Criminal justice reform in the United States